Several special routes of U.S. Route 54 exist, from Texas to Missouri. In order from southwest to northeast, separated by type, they are as follows.

Texas

El Paso business loop

New Mexico

Tucumcari business loop

Missouri

Lake Ozark business loop

U.S. Route 54 Business (US 54 Bus.) was a business route of US 54. It followed due west via Missouri Route 242 and then due south via Osage Beach Parkway. Then, it traveled due west via Bagnell Dam Boulevard to get to downtown Lake Ozark. It then continued to travel north to reconnect to US 54.

Before 1968, US 54 used to connect directly to Lake Ozark. In 1968, a bypass was finished which caused US 54 to get rerouted. As a result, Missouri Route 354 briefly appeared on a former alignment of US 54. In 1969, US 54 Business appeared, replacing Route 354 in the process.  The designation was removed in 2021.

Major intersections

Eldon business loop

U.S. Route 54 Business (US 54 Bus.) is a business route of US 54. It travels due northwest via Route 52 to connect to Eldon. It then travels due northeast to reconnect to US 54.

Before 1975, US 54 used to run towards Eldon. In 1975, US 54 bypassed Eldon which resulted in the creation of US 54 Business.

Major intersections

Jefferson City alternate route

Fulton business loop

U.S. Route 54 Business (US 54 Bus.) is a business route of US 54. It travels due northeast to connect to downtown Fulton. It then travels due north via Market Street, St. Louis Avenue, and Bluff Street before reconnecting to US 54.

Prior to 1972, US 54 used to run straight to Fulton. Since 1972, US 54 bypassed Fulton. This resulted in the creation of US 54 Business.

Mexico business loop

In the 1990s, US 54 was rerouted to bypass Mexico.

Major intersections

Bowling Green business loop

A  business loop exists in Bowling Green, Missouri. It intersects with Business 61. It is also known as Old U.S. Route 54.

Louisiana business loop

A three-mile business loop exists in Louisiana, Missouri.

Kankakee business loop

U.S. Route 54 Business (formerly U.S. Route 54 City) was a business route of US 54. Before 1959, US 54 ran through downtown Kankakee. In 1959, US 54 was rerouted onto a bypass (now part of Interstate 57) which, as a result, created US 54 City. It followed north through Kankakee via US 45/52 and present-day IL 50. It was then changed into US 54 Business in 1960. Originally, the freeway abruptly stopped at North Street which caused US 54 to travel west to its city route. It remained like that until 1962 when a freeway connection between US 54 Business and North Avenue was made. In 1969, US 54 supplanted its business route as the bypass was extended on both ends. Three years later, in 1972, US 54 was significantly truncated, removing a section of US 54 between Griggsville and Chicago.

References

54
54
54
54
54